North Hall High School is a public four-year comprehensive high school located in the northern portion of Hall County, Georgia, United States, in the foothills of the Appalachian Mountains.  North Hall serves Murrayville, Clermont, and portions of Gainesville. It is located 10 miles north of Gainesville and 15 miles south of Dahlonega.

History

Around 5:25 am on March 20, 1998, an F-3 tornado (see Fujita scale) hit northern sections of Hall County. It did heavy damage, killing 12 and leveling several structures. It became known as the "Pre-Dawn Killer". The tornado heavily damaged nearby Lanier Elementary School, before unroofing the high school.

Adjacent schools 
 North – White County High School
 South – Gainesville High School
 East – East Hall High School
 West – Lumpkin County High School
 Southwest – Chestatee High School

Academics
In 2010, North Hall was recognized statewide when Georgia Governor Sonny Perdue made a visit to recognize the 95% graduation rate achievement reached by the school. North Hall is a qualified International Baccalaureate school, meaning that it offers students the ability to earn an International Baccalaureate diploma.

School enrollment and demographics
 Total students – 1123 (as of 2020–2021)

By gender
Male – 593
Female – 530

By grade
 9 – 285
 10 – 335
 11 – 246
 12 – 257

By race
 White – 917
 Hispanic – 173
 Black – 8
 Asian – 2
 Native Hawaiian/Pacific Islander – 1
 American Indian/Alaska Native – 0
 Two or More Races – 22

Feeder schools

Middle schools
 North Hall Middle School

Elementary schools
 Mt. Vernon Exploratory Academy
 Riverbend Advanced Scholars Academy
 Wauka Mountain Multiple Intelligences Academy

Extracurricular activities
 Academic Team 
 Beta Club
 Cheerleading
 Chess Club
 Drama
 DECA
 FBLA
 FCA
 FCCLA
 FFA
 HOSA
 Humane Society
 JHBA
 Marching Band
 Spanish
 Speech & Debate Club
 Thespians

Athletics

 Baseball
 Basketball, men's and ladies'
 Cross country
 Football
 Golf, men's and ladies'
 Soccer, men's and ladies'
 Softball
 Swimming
 Tennis, men's and ladies' 
 Track and field
 Volleyball
 Wrestling

Band
The North Hall Band program consists of a marching band, symphonic band, concert band, jazz band, winter guard, indoor drumline, and several smaller ensembles.

Marching band
The Marching Trojan Band fields competes in competitions during the fall season as well as the annual Hall County Marching Exhibition.

Notable alumni
 Doug Collins – politician, former member of the U.S. House of Representatives
 Jody Davis – former catcher for Chicago Cubs and Atlanta Braves baseball teams
 Corey Hulsey – former NFL Oakland Raiders football player
James Jarrard – United States Army Major General and current Chief of Staff, United States Indo-Pacific Command

External links
 Official website

References

Educational institutions established in 1957
Schools in Hall County, Georgia
Public high schools in Georgia (U.S. state)
1957 establishments in Georgia (U.S. state)